Viola Township may refer to:

Illinois
 Viola Township, Lee County, Illinois

Iowa
 Viola Township, Audubon County, Iowa
 Viola Township, Osceola County, Iowa
 Viola Township, Sac County, Iowa

Kansas
 Viola Township, Sedgwick County, Kansas

Minnesota
 Viola Township, Olmsted County, Minnesota

South Dakota
 Viola Township, Jerauld County, South Dakota, in Jerauld County, South Dakota

See also
Viola (disambiguation)

Township name disambiguation pages